Euspira triseriata, common name the spotted moonsnail, is a species of predatory sea snail, a marine gastropod mollusk in the family Naticidae, the moon snails.

Distribution
This species occurs in the Northwest Atlantic Ocean.

Description 
The maximum recorded shell length is 33 mm.

Habitat 
Minimum recorded depth is 0 m. Maximum recorded depth is 274 m.

References

 Linkletter, L.E. 1977. A checklist of marine fauna and flora of the Bay of Fundy. Huntsman Marine Laboratory, St. Andrews, N.B. 68 p
 Bromley, J.E.C., and J.S. Bleakney. 1984. Keys to the fauna and flora of Minas Basin. National Research Council of Canada Report 24119. 366 p.
 Turgeon, D.D., et al. 1998. Common and scientific names of aquatic invertebrates of the United States and Canada. American Fisheries Society Special Publication 26
 Trott, T.J. 2004. Cobscook Bay inventory: a historical checklist of marine invertebrates spanning 162 years. Northeastern Naturalist (Special Issue 2): 261 - 324.
 Torigoe K. & Inaba A. (2011) Revision on the classification of Recent Naticidae. Bulletin of the Nishinomiya Shell Museum 7: 133 + 15 pp., 4 pls.

External links

Naticidae
Gastropods described in 1826